Heterotrophic picoplankton is the fraction of plankton composed by cells between 0.2 and 2 μm that do not perform photosynthesis.

Cells can be either :
 prokaryotes 
Archaea form a major part of the picoplankton in the Antarctic and are abundant in other regions of the ocean. Archaea have also been found in freshwater picoplankton, but do not appear to be so abundant in these environments.

 eukaryotes

References

Biological oceanography
Planktology
Aquatic ecology